Salvador Augusto Mijares Izquierdo (12 November 1897 – 29 June 1979), was a Venezuelan lawyer, historian, writer, educator and journalist. He is best known for El Libertador, his biography of Simón Bolívar. He was a member of the Venezuelan Academy of History (1947), the National Academy of Political Science (1960) and the Venezuelan Academy of Language (1971).

Bibliography 
1927 La patria de los venezolanos en 1750
1938 La interpretación pesimista de la sociología hispanoamericana
1940 Hombres e ideas de América
1943 Educación
1955 La luz y el espejo
1961 Ideología de la Revolución Emancipadora
1963 Lo afirmativo venezolano
1964 El Libertador (biography of Simón Bolívar)
1967 La evolución política de Venezuela
1971 Longitud y latitud

Mijares's other works include biographies of Simón Rodríguez, Fermín Toro, Rafael María Baralt and José Rafael Revenga.

References

Further reading
Simón Alberto Consalvi / Academia Nacional de la Historia (2003), Augusto Mijares: El pensador y su tiempo  
  
  
  

1897 births
1979 deaths
Venezuelan schoolteachers
20th-century Venezuelan lawyers
Venezuelan male writers
20th-century Venezuelan historians
Central University of Venezuela alumni
Ambassadors of Venezuela to Spain
Members of the Venezuelan Academy of Language
20th-century male writers
Education ministers of Venezuela